Spheniscid alphaherpesvirus 1 (SpAHV-1) is a species of virus in the genus Mardivirus, subfamily Alphaherpesvirinae, family Herpesviridae, and order Herpesvirales.

References 

Alphaherpesvirinae